Nicholas Mosley, 3rd Baron Ravensdale, 7th Baronet, MC, FRSL (25 June 1923 – 28 February 2017) was an English novelist.

Life
Mosley was born in London in 1923. He was the eldest son of Sir Oswald Mosley, 6th Baronet, a British politician, and his first wife, Lady Cynthia Mosley, a daughter of The 1st Marquess Curzon of Kedleston (Viceroy of India and later, at the time of Nicholas's birth, Foreign Secretary). In 1932 his father, Sir Oswald Mosley, founded the British Union of Fascists and became an open supporter of Benito Mussolini. The following year, when he was only 9, Nicholas's mother, Lady Cynthia, died, and in 1936 Diana Mitford, one of the Mitford sisters, who was already his father's mistress, became his stepmother.

As a young boy he began to stammer, and attended weekly sessions with the speech therapist Lionel Logue to help him manage it. He later said that his father claimed never really to have noticed this stammer, but still, he may, as a result of it, have been less aggressive when speaking to him than towards other people. Mosley was educated at Eton and Balliol College, Oxford. In 1940, his father was interned because of his campaigning against the war with Germany. The younger Mosley was still soon commissioned into the Rifle Brigade and saw active service in Italy, winning the Military Cross in 1945.<ref>[http://www.london-gazette.co.uk/issues/35893/supplements/699 London Gazette] Issue 37027; published 10 April 1945 (pg. 7 of 10).</ref>

In 1966, Mosley succeeded his aunt Irene Curzon, 2nd Baroness Ravensdale, his mother's elder sister, as Baron Ravensdale, thus gaining a seat in the House of Lords. On the death of his father, on 3 December 1980, he also succeeded to the Mosley Baronetcy of Ancoats. In 1983, two years after his father's death, Lord Ravensdale published Beyond the Pale: Sir Oswald Mosley and Family 1933–1980 in which he proved to be a harsh critic of his father. He called into question his father's motives and understanding of politics. The book contributed to the Channel 4 television programme Mosley (1998), based on Oswald Mosley's life. At the end of the serial, Nicholas is portrayed meeting his father in prison to ask him about his national allegiance.

He was a half-brother of Max Mosley, former President of the Fédération Internationale de l'Automobile (FIA).

Mosley died on 28 February 2017 and is buried in the western side of Highgate Cemetery.

Personal life

Mosley married twice and was the father of five children. On 14 November 1947 he married firstly Rosemary Laura Salmond (divorced 1974, died 1991), daughter of Sir John Maitland Salmond and the Honourable Monica Margaret Grenfell, and they had four children: 
 Hon. Shaun Nicholas Mosley (born 5 August 1949, died 10 December 2009), married 1978 Theresa Clifford, and had six children: Daniel Nicholas Mosley of Ancoats, 4th Baron Ravensdale, 8th Baronet (born 10 October 1982); Matthew Mosley (born 6 March 1985); Francis Mosley (born 5 July 1988); Aidan Clifford Mosley (born 1991); Thomas Mosley (born 23 December 1993); Monica Mosley (born 5 June 1996)
 Hon. Ivo Adam Rex Mosley (born 14 May 1951), married on 10 September 1977 Xanthe Jennifer Grenville Oppenheimer, daughter of Sir Michael Bernard Grenville Oppenheimer, 3rd Baronet, by his marriage on 12 July 1947 to Laetitia Helen Lucas-Tooth, daughter of Sir Hugh Vere Huntly Duff Munro-Lucas-Tooth, 1st Baronet, and Laetitia Florence Findlay, and they had four children: Nathaniel Inigo Mosley (born 15 July 1982); Felix Harry Mosley (born 6 November 1985); Scipio Louis Mosley (born 7 June 1988) and Noah Billy Mosley (born 10 October 1990).
 Hon. Robert Mosley (born 24 December 1955), married 1980 Victoria McBain, and they had three children: Gregory Mosley (born 9 May 1981); Vija Mosley (born 19 July 1985), a textile designer; married to Gregory Rhodes; and Orson Mosley (born 6 June 1994).
 Hon. Clare Mosley (born 11 November 1959), unmarried, who has a natural daughter named Rosie Mosley (born 29 February 1992).

In 1974, after a divorce, he married secondly Verity Elizabeth Raymond, daughter of John Raymond, and had one son:
Hon. Marius Mosley (born 28 May 1976).

Bibliography
Novels

 Spaces of the Dark (1951)
 The Rainbearers (1955)
 Corruption (1957)
 Meeting Place (1962)
 Accident (1965; filmed in 1966 by Joseph Losey with a screenplay by Harold Pinter)
 Assassins (1966)
 Impossible Object (1968; filmed in 1973 by John Frankenheimer as Story of a Love Story)
 Natalie Natalia (1971)
 Catastrophe Practice (1979) (Part One of the Catastrophe Practice Series)
 Imago Bird (1980) (Part Two of the Catastrophe Practice Series)
 Serpent (1981) (Part Three of the Catastrophe Practice Series)
 Judith (1986) (Part Four of the Catastrophe Practice Series)
 Hopeful Monsters (1990) (Part Five of the Catastrophe Practice Series) – which won the Whitbread Book of the Year Award.
 Children of Darkness and Light (1995)
 The Hesperides Tree (2001)
 Inventing God (2003)
 Look at the Dark (2005)
 God's Hazard (2009)
 A Garden of Trees (2012)
 Metamorphosis (2014)
 Tunnel of Babel (2016)
 Rainbow People (2018)

Non-fiction

 African Switchback (1958)
 The Life of Raymond Raynes (1961)The Assassination of Trotsky (1972; filmed by Joseph Losey) 
 Julian Grenfell, his life and the times of his death, 1888–1915 (1976; republished by Persephone Books in 1999)Rules of the Game: Sir Oswald and Lady Cynthia Mosley 1896–1933 (1982)Beyond the Pale: Sir Oswald Mosley and Family 1933–1980 (1983) 
 Experience and Religion: A Lay Essay in Theology (1965; first published in 1965 by Hodder & Stoughton)The Uses of Slime Mould – Essays of four Decades (2004)

Other
 Efforts at Truth (1994)
 Time at War (2006)
 Paradoxes of Peace'' (2009)

Further reading

Arms

References

1923 births
2017 deaths
Burials at Highgate Cemetery
Alumni of Balliol College, Oxford
Barons Ravensdale
20th-century English novelists
English people of American descent
Fellows of the Royal Society of Literature
People educated at Eton College
Recipients of the Military Cross
Rifle Brigade officers
British Army personnel of World War II
English male novelists
21st-century English novelists
Writers from London
20th-century English male writers
21st-century English male writers
Nicholas
Mosley baronets
Military personnel from London
Ravensdale